Maria Grazia Francia (17 September 1931 – 4 March 2021) was an Italian actress of classic cinema.

Career
Born in Florence, in the mid-1940s Francia moved to Rome to attend the Centro Sperimentale di Cinematografia. She eventually left the course to star alongside Anna Magnani in Gennaro Righelli's Abbasso la ricchezza!. Since then she appeared in several important films, directed by directors such as Luigi Zampa, Giuseppe De Santis and Mario Bonnard. She was also active on stage and on television dramas, before retiring from acting in the early 1970s. She died on March 4, 2021, at the age of 89 in Terni, Italy.

Selected filmography 
Peddlin' in Society (1946)
L'onorevole Angelina (1947)
Bitter Rice (1949)
 Flying Squadron (1949)
No Peace Under the Olive Tree (1950)
The Outlaws (1950)
Il voto (1950)

Santa Lucia luntana... (1951)
Due sorelle amano (1951)
Auguri e figli maschi (1951)
I figli non si vendono (1952)
Rome 11:00 (1952)
 The Angel of Sin (1952)
Voice of Silence (1953)
Rimorso (1953)
Milady and the Musketeers (1953) 
La peccatrice dell'isola (1953)
I piombi di Venezia (1953)
Schiava del peccato (1954) 
 Goodbye Naples (1955)
I pappagalli (1956) 
Accadde una notte (1956) 
La donna che amo (1957)
Goodbye, Firenze! (1958)
Tiro al piccione (1961)
 The Shoot (1964)
I soldi (1965)
Una carabina per Schüt (1966)

References

External links 
 

1931 births
2021 deaths
20th-century Italian actresses
Actors from Florence
Centro Sperimentale di Cinematografia alumni
Italian film actresses
Italian stage actresses
Italian television actresses